Hector Ortiz is the name of:

 Héctor Ortiz (baseball) (born 1969), Puerto Rican baseball player
 Héctor Ortiz (referee) (born 1933), Paraguayan football referee
 Héctor Ortiz Ortiz (born 1950), Mexican politician
 Héctor Ortiz (footballer) (born 1928), Mexican footballer
 Héctor Ortiz (athlete), Puerto Rican athlete, see 1971 Central American and Caribbean Championships in Athletics